Cowan Head is a hamlet in Cumbria, England. It is on the River Kent upstream from Burneside.

See also 
 Burneside Paper Mills Tramway

References

Hamlets in Cumbria
South Lakeland District